William Kimber was a musician and dancer.

Billy or William Kimber may also refer to:

Billy Kimber (gangster), real-life head of the Birmingham Boys
Billy Kimber, fictional character in Peaky Blinders (TV series), based on the real life Billy Kimber.